Annihilation is an album by the Brazilian death metal band Rebaelliun. It was released in 2001 by Hammerheart Records.

Track listing 

  "Annihilation"   – 5:00  
  "Rebellious Vengeance"  – 4:28  
  "Steel Siege"  – 3:41  
  "Red Spikes"  – 3:21  
  "Unleash the Fire"  – 5:05  
  "Unborn Consecration"  – 4:53  
  "God of a Burned Land"  – 3:59  
  "Bringer of War"  – 4:23  
  "Defying the Plague"  – 3:15

Personnel 

Lohy Fabiano – bass, vocals
Fabiano Penna Corrêa – guitar
Ronaldo Lima – guitar
Sandro Moreira – drums
Andy Classen – producer
Schosch Classen – sound engineer
Rob Essers – mastering engineer

References

2001 albums
Rebaelliun albums
Albums produced by Andy Classen
Hammerheart Records albums